The enzyme diisopropyl-fluorophosphatase (EC 3.1.8.2)   catalyzes the reaction 

diisopropyl fluorophosphate + H2O  diisopropyl phosphate + fluoride

This enzyme belongs to the family of hydrolases, specifically those acting on ester bonds phosphoric-triester hydrolases.  The systematic name is diisopropyl-fluorophosphate fluorohydrolase. Other names in common use include DFPase, tabunase, somanase, organophosphorus acid anhydrolase, organophosphate acid anhydrase, OPA anhydrase, diisopropylphosphofluoridase, dialkylfluorophosphatase, diisopropyl phosphorofluoridate hydrolase, isopropylphosphorofluoridase, and diisopropylfluorophosphonate dehalogenase.  It employs one cofactor, divalent cation.  At least one compound, chelating agent is known to inhibit this enzyme.

Structural studies

References

 Boyer, P.D., Lardy, H. and Myrback, K. (Eds.), The Enzymes, 2nd ed., vol. 4, Academic Press, New York, 1960, p. 541-550.

EC 3.1.8
Enzymes of known structure